VEGAS.com, LLC is a destination-specific Online Travel Agency (OTA) founded in 1998 and headquartered in Las Vegas, Nevada. VEGAS.com provides extensive travel content and books discounted travel products including hotel rooms, air-hotel packages, show tickets, tours, dining, golf, and other activities exclusively for the Las Vegas destination. VEGAS.com was one of The Greenspun Corporation's family of companies. It is now owned by Remark Holdings, the publicly traded company formerly known as Remark Media.

History
Vegas.com was previously operated by The Las Vegas Sun, a newspaper distributed in Las Vegas. In 2005, in a Chicago Tribune article,  Vegas.com was ranked among the 50 most popular travel websites.

In 2015, Las Vegas-based Remark Holdings (then known as Remark Media) acquired Vegas.com with the goal of making it the "go-to booking destination for new millennial travelers." Remark Media paid a reported $15.5 million in cash and $9.5 million in stock, with $10 million in future stock options and up to $3 million depending on Vegas.com's performance in the following three years.

Souvenir stores
The company also operates five souvenir stores in Las Vegas, in partnership with Marshall Retail Group.

See also
Vegas.com 500

References

Further reading

External links 
 

Companies based in Las Vegas
American travel websites